Doonbeg is a village in west County Clare, Ireland on the Atlantic coast. The surrounding natural environment has supported its development as a tourist resort. The area was officially classified as part of the West Clare Gaeltacht, an Irish-speaking community, until 1956.

Location

Doonbeg is situated on the N67 between the towns of Kilkee and Milltown Malbay. The nearest large towns are Kilrush and Kilkee, which are both approximately 7 miles away.

The village is located in civil parish of Killard. It is part of the parish of Doonbeg (Killard) in the Roman Catholic Diocese of Killaloe.

Doonbeg is surrounded by farmland, some of which is used for dairy farming. There is also an area of bogland near the village. The Doonbeg River flows through the village and enters the Atlantic Ocean at the nearby Doonbeg Bay.

History
Evidence of ancient settlement in the area include a number of ringfort sites in the surrounding townlands of Doonbeg, Doonmore and Mountrivers.

A settlement has existed at the site of the current village, at the river crossing in Doonbeg townland, since medieval times. The village name Dun Beag, or small fort, may refer to Doonbeg Castle or an earlier fortification located at the river crossing. Now in ruin, Doonbeg Castle was built in the 16th century, and has been historically associated with the MacMahon and O'Brien clans.

Amenities
The village holds the church of Our Lady Assumed into Heaven. 
It is a modern church, noteworthy for the stained-glass windows that are uniquely designed so that the various colours illuminate the altar throughout the day. The church was built in 1976 and has an uncommon octagonal shape. It replaced the older cross-shaped church that was built in 1813.

Doonbeg also has several pubs, Doonbeg National School, two shops, a post office and a village hall and a tourist office.
The central point of the village is an early 19th-century seven-arched stone bridge which crosses the Doonbeg River and divides the village. The crossing is overlooked by the remaining fortifications of Doonbeg castle.

Transport
Bus Éireann route number 333 links the village to Ennis via Lahinch and Kilfenora with one journey each way daily except Sundays. Onward rail and bus services are available at Ennis. There is also a Tuesday only route 333 to Kilrush.

Sport
Gaelic football is popular in Doonbeg. The main playing area is the Shanahan McNamara Memorial grounds which are located outside the village. Doonbeg GAA is among the most successful Gaelic football clubs in the Clare Senior Football Championship, having won 18 county titles. Doonbeg's football team is known as "The Magpies" because of the black and white shirts which are traditionally worn.

Doonbeg Golf Club, now known as Trump International Golf Links and Hotel Ireland, is situated outside the village.

Doonbeg is home to one of Clare's best-known surf beaches, known locally as "Doughmore". The beach includes hazards such as strong rip currents and has been signposted as "dangerous for bathing" by Clare County Council. The beach runs parallel to Doonbeg Golf Course which must be crossed in order to get onto the beach.

Tourism
Cultural events in the village and area include the Willie Keane Memorial Weekend (in October), a jazz festival (in June), and the West Clare Drama Festival (which was established in 1962).

In the outlying parish, scenic areas include the cliffs of Ballard and Killard and the White Strand beach which is located in the townland of Killard. Surfing has become common in recent times along the northern coastline of the parish.

The White Strand beach in Killard attracts visitors during the summer. Nearby there is a monument to Pat McDonald who was born in Killard and won an Olympic Gold Medal representing the US in Men's Shot Put. When he won his Olympic gold medal in 1920, he was aged 42, making him the oldest Olympic track & field champion ever.

There are picnic areas on the banks of the river near the bridge. Fishing is also possible in the river and around the coastal area of Doonbeg, with shore fishing from the Blue Pool in Ballard.

Notable people
David Tubridy – Clare footballer who became top scorer in National Football League history against Cork in May 2021 his total score in the competition after this game (22–412, i.e. 478 points) causing him to overtake Mickey Kearins
Tommy Tubridy – Clare footballer and father of David
Barney McMahon – Brigadier General, Irish Air Corps

See also
 List of towns and villages in Ireland

References

Towns and villages in County Clare